General elections were held in Kenya between 25 September and 2 October 1956, with additional elections in March 1957 for eight African constituencies, the first in which Africans could be elected. The elections in 1956 were open to Europeans and Indians. In the European constituencies the results saw eight Independent Group members and six independents (all from the United Country Party) elected.

For the elections for the African constituencies in 1957 there were 37 candidates, whilst voter turnout was 78.5%.

Results

European constituencies

Indian constituencies

Arab constituency

African constituencies

References

1956
General election
General election
1956 elections in Africa
1957 elections in Africa
Legislative Council of Kenya
September 1956 events in Africa
October 1956 events in Africa
March 1957 events in Africa